Kethel, the village at the origin of Kethel en Spaland (a former municipality in the Netherlands).
 Alexander Kethel (1832-1916), a Scottish-born Australian politician and timber merchant.